Arignar Anna Alandur Metro, commonly known as the Alandur Metro, is an elevated metro station that is part of the Blue Line and the Green Line of the Chennai Metro, and serves as an interchange station between the two lines. The station is one of the two metro stations where the two lines intersect, the other being the Chennai Central metro station. It is the city's first multi-level railway station. It is the only station where passengers from the two corridors can swap the direction of travel. On 31 July 2020, It has been named by Government of Tamil Nadu as Arignar Anna Alandur Metro to honor the DMK founder and the former Chief Minister of Tamil Nadu C. N. Annadurai.

The station

As the station acts as a transit point for two different corridors of the Chennai Metro, the two lines are constructed at two different levels at the station—the first one serving the line from Guindy towards Officers Training Academy (OTA) and Chennai International Airport and the second one for the line from St. Thomas Mount towards Chennai Mofussil Bus Terminus. The two levels are being built at 26.55 m and 35.41 m within the station, connected by means of escalators. Each levels will have two access points for entry and exit. A mezzanine floor—an intermediate level between ground floor and level I—is being built to be utilised for maintenance purpose.

A total of eight elevators will function at the station—four connecting the ground floor with level I and another four, along with four escalators, connecting level I with level II. The station will have 10 ticket counters apart from 18 automatic ticket-vending machines (ATVMs).

The station will have four access points on the ground floor—two for entry/exit from the front and two more on the rear. Ticket counters, one at either side of the lobby, are located past the access points. Crossing the lobby, passengers can move on to level I using any of the eight escalators and four lifts.

Level I is the alighting point for those travelling on the Guindy–OTA–Airport route. From this level, there are four escalators and lifts leading to level II, from where passengers bound for the Koyambedu–SIDCO–St. Thomas Mount route can embark.

The station will also have disabled-friendly facilities, including separate escalators and entry ramps.

The station is one of the few in the corridor that will have parking facilities.

Station layout

Receiving sub-station

A 230-kV receiving substation (RSS) is being built by the Tamil Nadu Electricity Board near the station for CMRL project. TNEB would supply 110 kV power from nearby TNEB substation (being built by TNEB) to the RSS, which will be stepped down to 33 kV and 25 kv by two transformers. The station is one of the three stations in the Chennai Metro Rail network to have a 230-kV receiving sub-station for power supply from the state's electricity grid, the other two being Koyambedu and Chennai Central metro.

Supporting facilities
The Cantonment Board has decided to set up three AC bus shelters at Asar Ghana junction near the metro station, which would become an intermodal transport hub. Each shelter will be spread over 370 sq ft with a seating capacity of 32 passengers and standing capacity of 45. Other facilities at the shelters would include ATM, CCTV, security guards, public urinals, drinking water, coffee vending machines and announcements about bus arrivals. Commuters will be able to see a bus coming from 500 metres on an LCD screen in the shelter. This would be the first of AC bus shelters in Chennai. The shelters would come up under a PPP model at an estimated cost of  12.5 million, which would be constructed and maintained for five years by a private firm, after which it will hand over the shelters to the board. The firm's revenue generation would be through advertisements in the shelter.

In May 2018, CMRL began construction of foot overbridge at the station at a cost of  90 million and is expected to be completed in eight months.

Commercial hub
Arignar Anna Alandur metro station is one of the five stations in the first phase of the Chennai Metro project identified to be converted into commercial hubs, the others being Puratchi Thalaivi Dr. J. Jayalalithaa CMBT Metro, Arumbakkam, Ekkattuthangal, and Ashok Nagar. A 118,000 sq ft building with a basement and stilt floor for car park is planned behind the station.

See also

 List of Chennai metro stations
 Railway stations in Chennai
 Chennai Metro

References

External links

Official Website for Chennai Metro Rail Limited

Chennai Metro stations
Railway stations in Chennai
2015 establishments in Tamil Nadu
Railway stations in India opened in 2015